Sovereign class may refer to:

 A class of people who are sovereign, who have personal sovereignty
 , of the Royal Caribbean line
 Sovereign-class Federation starship (Star Trek), a class warship starship, see USS Enterprise (NCC-1701-E)
 Sovereign Star Destroyer (Star Wars), a class of Star Destroyer warship starship
 , aka Sovereign, British pre-dreadnaught Royal Navy warship class
 , aka Royal Sovereign or Sovereign, British dreadnaught Royal Navy warship class

See also
 Sovereign (disambiguation)
 Sovereign of the Seas (disambiguation)
 Royal Sovereign (disambiguation)